Allendale is a census-designated place (CDP) in Solano County, California, United States. The population was 1,506 at the 2010 census.

Geography
According to the United States Census Bureau, the CDP covers an area of 6.2 square miles (16.1 km2), 98.98% of it land and 1.02% of it water.

Demographics

The 2010 United States Census reported that 1,506 people, 528 households, and 431 families resided in the CDP. The racial makeup of the CDP was 82.3% White (75.0% non-Hispanic), 3.3% African American, 1.5% Native American, 2.8% Asian, 0.1% Pacific Islander, 5.2% from other races, and 4.8% from two or more races. 15.6% of the population was Hispanic or Latino of any race.

The Census reported that 99.7% of the population lived in households and 0.3% lived in non-institutionalized group quarters.

There were 528 households, out of which 32.4% had children under the age of 18 living in them, 71.2% were opposite-sex married couples living together, 5.3% had a female householder with no husband present, and 5.1% had a male householder with no wife present. 4.2% of households were unmarried opposite-sex partnerships and 0.8% were same-sex married couples or partnerships. 15.0% of households were made up of individuals, and 5.9% had someone living alone who was 65 years of age or older. The average household size was 2.84 and the average family size was 3.11.

The population was spread out, with 21.0% under the age of 18, 7.1% aged 18 to 24, 16.9% aged 25 to 44, 38.9% aged 45 to 64, and 16.1% who were 65 years of age or older. The median age was 47.3 years. For every 100 females, there were 105.2 males. For every 100 females age 18 and over, there were 103.4 males.

There were 554 housing units, of which 89.2% were owner-occupied and 10.8% were occupied by renters. The homeowner vacancy rate was 0%; the rental vacancy rate was 5.0%. 89.2% of the population lived in owner-occupied housing units and 10.4% lived in rental housing units.

Notable residents
John Udell, diarist of the American Frontier lived in Allendale from 1859 to 1871.

Literary reference

Allendale, CA, is the setting of Ray Bradbury's short story, "There Will Come Soft Rains".

References

Census-designated places in Solano County, California
Census-designated places in California